The following Confederate States Army units and commanders fought in the Battle of the Wilderness (May 5–7, 1864) of the American Civil War. The Union order of battle is listed separately. Order of battle compiled from the army organization May 5–6, 1864, the army organization at beginning of the Campaign, the army organization during the Campaign and the reports.<ref>Official Records, Series I, Volume XXXVI, Part 1, pages 1162–1168</ref>

Abbreviations used

Military rank
 Gen = General
 LTG = Lieutenant General
 MG = Major General
 BG = Brigadier General
 Col = Colonel
 Ltc = Lieutenant Colonel
 Maj = Major
 Cpt = Captain

Other
 (w) = wounded
 (mw) = mortally wounded
 (k) = killed in action
 (c) = captured

Army of Northern Virginia

Gen Robert E. Lee

General Staff:
 Chief Engineer: MG Martin L. Smith
 Chief of Artillery: BG William N. Pendleton
 Assistant Adjutant General: Ltc Walter H. Taylor
 Aide de Camp: Ltc Charles Marshall
 Aide de Camp: Maj Charles S. Venable

First Corps

LTG James Longstreet (w)

MG Charles W. Field

MG Richard H. Anderson

Second Corps

LTG Richard S. Ewell

General Staff:
 Assistant Adjutant General: Ltc Alexander S. Pendleton
 Assistant Adjutant General: Maj Campbell Brown
 Assistant Inspector General: Col Abner Smead
 Engineer: Maj Benjamin H. Greene
 Aide de Camp: Lt Thomas T. Turner
 Chief of Ordnance: Ltc William Allan
 Medical Director: Dr. Hunter H. McGuire
 Quartermasters: Maj John D. Rogers and Maj A. M. Garber
 Commissaries and subsistence: Maj Wells J. Hawks and Cpt J. J. Lock

Third Corps

LTG Ambrose P. Hill

Cavalry Corps

MG J.E.B. Stuart

Strengths
The following table shows total strengths of each of the major formations at the start of the battle.

First Corps

Second Corps

Third Corps

Cavalry Corps

Total Army of Northern Virginia

Notes

See also
 Spotsylvania Court House Confederate order of battle
 Cold Harbor Confederate order of battle

References
 Boyd, Charles E. The Devil's Den: A History of the 44th Alabama Volunteer Infantry Regiment, Confederate States Army, 1862-1865. Birmingham, AL: Banner Press, 1987. .
 Eicher, John H., and Eicher, David J. Civil War High Commands. Stanford, CA: Stanford University Press, 2001. .
 Rhea, Gordon C. The Battle of the Wilderness May 5–6, 1864. Baton Rouge: Louisiana State University Press, 1994. 
 Rhea, Gordon C. To the North Anna River: Grant and Lee, May 13–25, 1864. Baton Rouge: Louisiana State University Press, 2000. 
 Rhea, Gordon C. Cold Harbor: Grant and Lee, May 26-June 3, 1864. Baton Rouge: Louisiana State University Press, 2002 
 Sibley, Jr., F. Ray, The Confederate Order of Battle, Volume 1, The Army of Northern Virginia, Shippensburg, Pennsylvania, 1996. 
 U.S. War Department, The War of the Rebellion: a Compilation of the Official Records of the Union and Confederate Armies, U.S. Government Printing Office, 1880–1901.
 Wise, Jennings C., The Long Arm of Lee, Volumen 2: Chancellorsville to Appomattox, University of Nebraska Press, Lincoln and London, 1991 
Wittenberg, Eric J. Glory Enough For All: Sheridan's Second Raid and the Battle of Trevilian Station. Washington, DC: Brassey's, Inc, 2001. 
 Young, Alfred C., III. Lee's Army during the Overland Campaign: A Numerical Study''. Baton Rouge: Louisiana State University Press, 2013. .

American Civil War orders of battle